There is a significant Argentine diaspora in Mexico. According to the 2010 census, there were 13,696 registered Argentine citizens living in Mexico, an increase from the 6,465 registered in the 2000 census. Argentine immigrants constitute the second largest community of South Americans in Mexico (after Colombian Mexicans) and the fifth largest immigrant community overall.

The Argentine-Mexican community is sometimes known as ArgenMex.

History
Argentines have been in Mexico since at least the 1895 census, and periodic migration has continued following the ebb and flow of the Argentine economy. Both countries share the Spanish language; their historical origins are common (part of the Spanish Empire). With two main emigrant waves; during the 1970s Dirty War and after the 2001 economic crisis.

The largest Argentine community is in Mexico City (with a sizeable congregation in the Condesa neighborhood) and there are smaller communities in Leon, Guadalajara, Puebla, Cancun, Playa del Carmen, Tulum, Mérida, Monterrey and Tampico. Most Argentines established in Mexico come from the provinces of Buenos Aires, Santa Fe, Cordoba and Tucuman. The Argentine community has participated in the opening of establishments such as restaurants, bars, boutiques, modeling consultants, foreign exchange interbank markets, among other lines of business.

Culture

Argentine actors have an important presence in Mexico's television industry. Frequently, actors arrive in Mexico to learn neutral Spanish (based on Mexican Spanish and used for mass media distributed across Latin America, such as dubbed foreign films,) and remain as they find work with one of the country's major television networks. Notable among these actors are the telenovela galanes (male leads) Juan Soler and Sebastian Rulli. In the music industry, prominent Argentine-Mexicans include Amanda Miguel, Fey and Noel Schajris.

There has been controversy in Mexico over the inclusion of naturalized Mexicans (especially Argentine-Mexicans) on Mexico's national football team. The arguments range from xenophobic ideas to the belief that Argentines have been granted citizenship in order to be eligible players on the team. Nonetheless, Argentines wanting to attain Mexican citizenship have to do so through meeting naturalization and residency requirements.

Argentine-Mexicans

Notable Argentine Mexicans

Notable Mexicans with Argentine origins

See also
Argentina–Mexico relations

References

External links	
 Los que llegaron - Argentinos from Canal Once (In Spanish)

 
Ethnic groups in Mexico
Mexico
Immigration to Mexico